Johnathan James Herd (born 3 October 1989) is an English footballer who plays as a defender for St Ives Town.

Playing career
Herd made his debut for Southend United away at Telford United, in the 2–2 draw in the FA Cup first round on 8 November 2008 .

He was in the Southend United starting line up for the FA Cup third-round game against Chelsea at Stamford Bridge. Southend's equaliser came from a Herd long throw, which was inadvertently flicked on by Ricardo Carvalho for Peter Clarke to score. In May 2011, he was one of five players told they were to be released by the club.

On 11 August 2011, Herd signed for Ebbsfleet United, and in early September he scored his first career goal in the away tie at Kidderminster Harriers in a 2–2 draw. Herd's appearances were less regular in the second half of the season due to the form of Joe Howe and he was released by Ebbsfleet at the end of the season. Following his release, Herd signed for  Bishop's Stortford on a one-year deal.

On 20 January 2017, it was confirmed that Herd had joined St Neots Town.  Following financial issues at the club, Herd signed for Southern League Division One Central side Peterborough Sports in February 2019. In March 2022, Herd joined Mildenhall Town on loan. Herd achieved two promotions with Peterborough Sports as they reached the National League North during his final season.

In July 2022, Herd joined St Ives Town.

Personal life
He is the son of Andrew Herd who played as an Ewok and Jawa in the Star Wars trilogy Return of the Jedi,
Also as a Gringotts Goblin in the Harry Potter trilogy Philosophers Stone and Deathly Hallows part 2.
Johnny is also great grandson of Fred Herd (Professional Golfer at St Andrews golf club Fyfe Scotland) who won the US Open golf championship in 1898.

References

External links

1989 births
Living people
English footballers
Association football defenders
Southend United F.C. players
Ebbsfleet United F.C. players
Bishop's Stortford F.C. players
St Neots Town F.C. players
Peterborough Sports F.C. players
Mildenhall Town F.C. players
St Ives Town F.C. players
English Football League players
National League (English football) players
Southern Football League players
Eastern Counties Football League players